The 2010 Beijing International Challenger was a professional tennis tournament played on outdoor hard courts. It was the first edition of the tournament which is part of the 2010 ATP Challenger Tour. It took place in Beijing, China between 2 and 8 August 2010.

ATP entrants

Seeds

 Rankings are as of July 26, 2010.

Other entrants
The following players received wildcards into the singles main draw:
  Bai Yan
  Chang Yu
  Li Zhe
  Wu Di

The following players received entry from the qualifying draw:
  Tiago Fernandes
  Gao Peng
  Wang Chuhan
  Xu Junchao

Champions

Men's singles

 Franko Škugor def.  Laurent Recouderc, 4–6, 6–4, 6–3

Women's singles
 Junri Namigata def.  Zhang Shuai, 7–6(3) 6–3

Men's doubles

 Pierre-Ludovic Duclos /  Artem Sitak def.  Sadik Kadir /  Purav Raja, 7–6(4), 7–6(5)

Women's doubles
 Sun Shengnan /  Zhang Shuai def.  Ji Chunmei /  Liu Wanting, 4–6, 6–2, [10–5]

External links
Official Site
ITF search 
2010 Draws

Beijing International Challenger
Beijing International Challenger
Beijing International Challenger
Beijing International Challenger